The 2001–02 season was Olympiacos's 43rd consecutive season in the Alpha Ethniki and their 76th year in existence. The club were played their 5th consecutive season in the UEFA Champions League. In the beginning of the summertime Olympiacos named Greek Takis Lemonis coach.

Squad

Competitions

Alpha Ethniki

League standings

Results summary

Results by round

Results
Match dates not available

Olympiacos - AEK 4-1
Olympiacos - Akratitos 2-2
Olympiacos - Aris 0-1
Olympiacos - Egaleo 3-0
Olympiacos - Ethnikos Asteras 6-0
Olympiacos - Ionikos 5-0
Olympiacos - Iraklis 3-0
Olympiacos - OFI Crete 3-0
Olympiacos - Panachaiki 4-0
Olympiacos - Panathinaikos 2-2
Olympiacos - Panionios 2-0
Olympiacos - PAOK 3-2
Olympiacos - Skoda Xanthi 1-1

AEK - Olympiacos 2-3
Akratitos Liosia - Olympiacos 2-3
Aris - Olympiacos 1-5
Egaleo - Olympiacos 3-4
Ethnikos Asteras - Olympiacos 2-4
Ionikos - Olympiacos 0-2
Iraklis - Olympiacos 1-1
OFI Crete - Olympiacos 1-1
Panachaiki - Olympiacos 1-3
Panathinaikos - Olympiacos 1-1
Panionios - Olympiacos 3-1
PAOK - Olympiacos 1-1
Skoda Xanthi - Olympiacos 1-2

UEFA Champions League

Group stage

All times at CET

Team kit

|

|

|

References

External links 
 Official Website of Olympiacos Piraeus 

2001-02
Greek football clubs 2001–02 season
2001–02